Thomas Shahan Ulen is an American law and economics professor, currently serving as Swanlund Chair Emeritus at the University of Illinois at Urbana-Champaign (UIUC).

Education 
Tom Ulen studied at Dartmouth College, obtaining a Bachelor of Arts in 1968. After serving in the Peace Corps for two years, he returned to school, receiving a postgraduate degree (Master of Arts) from Oxford University in 1972. In 1979 he obtained a Ph.D from Stanford University.

Research and Publications 
Professor Ulen currently holds one of the highest endowed chairs at UIUC, and serves as Director of the Law School's Program in Law and Economics. He also holds positions at the UIUC's Department of Economics and at the Institute for Government and Public Affairs.

In 2007 Katholieke Universiteit Leuven presented Professor Ulen with an honorary doctorate (doctor honoris causa). He currently is a member of American Law and Economics Association, American Economic Association, American Bar Association (associate member).

A prolific writer, Ulen authored seven books (of which "Law and Economics" is a global leading textbook), more than seventy articles and tens of other materials (book chapters, essays, reviews). He is considered one of the greatest minds in his field: "Tom Ulen is one of the great pioneers of law and economics. He, along with William Landes, Mitch Polinsky, Al Klevorick, and Steve Shavell represent the first wave of PhD economists teaching in law schools and publishing in law reviews. [Tom] is also one of the great expositors of law and economics"

References 

 Aharon Barak, Yale Law School. . Retrieved on 12 June 2013

External links 
 http://www.law.illinois.edu/faculty/profile/thomasulen
 http://www.law.illinois.edu/content/faculty/vitae/ThomasUlen.pdf
 http://heartland.org/thomas-s-ulen

Living people
1946 births
Dartmouth College alumni
Alumni of the University of Oxford
Stanford University alumni